Mustafa Shakir (born August 21, 1976) is an American actor known for his portrayal as Bushmaster in Marvel's Luke Cage, Big Mike in The Deuce and Jet Black in Cowboy Bebop (2021).

Biography and career
Shakir was born in North Carolina and grew up in Harlem.

He attended The New School and graduated in 2001.

Before acting, Shakir was a barber.

Shakir earned one of the lead roles in the short lived Quarry and made a guest appearance on Timeless. He had previously auditioned for the roles of Black Lightning in the eponymous television show and M'Baku in Black Panther, but failed to acquire either role. He was cast as John McIver/Bushmaster, in the second season of Luke Cage. In 2021 he starred in the Netflix live-action adaptation of Cowboy Bebop as Jet Black which was cancelled after one season. 

Shakir is a strict vegan.

Filmography

References

External links

1976 births
21st-century American male actors
American male film actors
American male television actors
Living people
People from Harlem
The New School alumni